Tomiyamichthys is a genus of gobies found from the Red Sea through the Indian Ocean to the western Pacific Ocean.

Etymology
The name of this genus honours the Japanese ichthyologist Itiro Tomiyama of the Tokyo Imperial University, who described the  type species, Tomiyamichthys oni, in 1936.

Species
There are currently 14 recognized species in this genus:
 Tomiyamichthys alleni Iwata, Ohnishi & Hirata, 2000 (Allen's shrimpgoby)
 Tomiyamichthys dorsostigma Bogorodsky, Kovačić & J. E. Randall, 2011
 Tomiyamichthys fourmanoiri (J. L. B. Smith, 1956)
 Tomiyamichthys gomezi G. R. Allen & Erdmann, 2012 (Gomez' shrimpgoby)
 Tomiyamichthys lanceolatus (Yanagisawa, 1978) (Lanceolate shrimpgoby)
 Tomiyamichthys latruncularius (Klausewitz, 1974) (Fan shrimpgoby)
 Tomiyamichthys levisquama Hoese, Shibukawa & J. W. Johnson, 2016 
 Tomiyamichthys nudus G. R. Allen & Erdmann, 2012 (Scale-less shrimpgoby)
 Tomiyamichthys oni  (Tomiyama, 1936) (Monster shrimpgoby)
 Tomiyamichthys praealta (Lachner & McKinney, 1981) (Tall-fin shrimpgoby)
 Tomiyamichthys russus (Cantor, 1849) (Ocellated shrimpgoby) 
 Tomiyamichthys smithi (I. S. Chen & L. S. Fang, 2003) (Smith's shrimpgoby)
 Tomiyamichthys tanyspilus  J. E. Randall & I. S. Chen, 2007 (Long-spot shrimpgoby) 
 Tomiyamichthys zonatus G. R. Allen, 2015 (Brown-band shrimpgoby)

References

 
Gobiinae
Taxa named by J. L. B. Smith